Meredith Francesca Small (born 20 November 1950) is a Professor Emerita of Anthropology at Cornell University and popular science author.  She was born in St. Louis, Missouri. She has been widely published in academic journals, and her research is presented in her most popular book: Our Babies, Ourselves. She spent many years studying both people and primate behaviour. Her current area of interest is in the intersection of biology and culture, and how that has influenced parenting.

Career

Small entered the field in the late 1970s working on captive macaques at the California Primate Center in Davis, California, where she received a Ph.D. in 1980. She worked in the anthropological genetics laboratory of David Glenn Smith and spent one year in France studying the mating and mother-infant behavior of Barbary macaques. Small also spent some time in Bali, Indonesia, working on crab-eating or long-tail macaques. In 1988 Small moved to Cornell University where she was a professor of anthropology until 2016, the first woman in the department to become a full professor.  In 1995, she was named a Weiss Presidential Fellow, the highest teaching award at Cornell.

Small began writing extensively for the popular audience just before her move to Cornell, and by the 1990s, Small shifted into mainstream journalism, writing articles for such publications as Natural History, Discover magazine, Scientific American and New Scientist. She regards this work as a form of teaching.

In 2005, the American Anthropological Association awarded her an Anthropology in Media award for "the successful communication of anthropology to the general public through the media" and for her "broad and sustained public impact at local, national and international levels."

Her articles have twice been in included in The Best Science and Nature Writing series.

From 2007 until 2010 she wrote a weekly column called Human Nature for LiveScience.com and these can still be viewed online. In 2014, she published her first fiction book, the beginning of a series featuring detective Grace McCloud.

In 2016, Small retired from Cornell and moved to Philadelphia.

Books
1984 - Female Primates: Studies by Women Primatologists (edited by Meredith F. Small). A. R. Liss: New York
1993 - Female Choices; Sexual Behavior of Female Primates. Cornell University Press: Ithaca, NY.
1995 - What's Love Got to do with it? The Evolution of Human Mating. Anchor Books (Doubleday)
1998 - Our Babies, Ourselves; How Biology and Culture Shape the Way we Parent. Anchor Books (Doubleday).
2001 - Kids: How Biology and Culture Shape the Way We Raise Our Children. Doubleday.
2006 - The Culture of Our Discontent; Beyond the Medical Model of Mental Illness. Joseph Henry Press: Washington, DC.
2014 - Fall Creek. Lavori a Mano Press: Ithaca, NY

External links
 Prime Mates: The Useful Promiscuity of Bonobo Apes by Meredith F. Small ...: www.nerve.com/Dispatches/Small/bonobo/ Written by Meredith Small
 DNA Kits: Secrets of Your Past or Scientific Scam? LiveScience: www.livescience.com/history/071207-hn-dna-kits.html
 Babies, Ourselves with Meredith F. Small: www.medicinenet.com/script/main/art.asp?articlekey=54322
 Meredith Small - Department of Anthropology at Cornell University:  (accessed 6 Sept 2014)
 Meredith Small, personal webpage:  (accessed 6 Sept 2014)

References

American anthropologists
Women primatologists
Primatologists
Cornell University faculty
University of California, Davis alumni
1950 births
Living people